The 2023 Newcastle Knights season is the 36th in the club's history. Coached by Adam O'Brien and co-captained by Jayden Brailey and Kalyn Ponga, they compete in the NRL's 2023 Telstra Premiership.

Squad

Transfers and Re-signings

Gains

Losses

Promoted juniors

Re-signings

Player contract situations

Ladder

Milestones
 Round 1: Adam Elliott made his debut for the club, after previously playing for the Canberra Raiders.
 Round 1: Jackson Hastings made his debut for the club, after previously playing for the Wests Tigers, and kicked his 1st goal for the club.
 Round 1: Jack Hetherington made his debut for the club, after previously playing for the Canterbury-Bankstown Bulldogs.
 Round 1: Lachie Miller made his debut for the club, after previously playing for the Cronulla-Sutherland Sharks.
 Round 2: Lachlan Fitzgibbon played his 100th career game.
 Round 2: Tyson Gamble made his debut for the club, after previously playing for the Brisbane Broncos.
 Round 3: Tom Cant made his NRL debut for the club.
 Round 3: Dane Gagai played his 150th game for the club and captained his 1st game for the club.
 Round 3: Tyson Gamble scored his 1st try for the club.
 Round 3: Jackson Hastings captained his 1st game for the club.
 Round 3: Dylan Lucas made his NRL debut for the club.
 Round 3: Lachie Miller scored his 1st try for the club and kicked his 1st career goal.
 Round 3: Ryan Rivett made his NRL debut for the club.

Jerseys and sponsors
In 2023, the Knights' jerseys are made by Classic Sportswear and their major sponsor is nib Health Funds.

Fixtures

Pre-season Trials

Source:

Regular Season

Statistics

25 players used.

Source:

NRL Women's team

Representative honours

The following players appeared in a representative match or were named in a representative squad in 2023.

Indigenous All Stars
Ronald Griffiths (coach)

Indigenous All Stars (Women's)
Bree Chester (squad member)
Kirra Dibb
Caitlan Johnston (squad member)
Bobbi Law
Mia Middleton

Māori All Stars
Leo Thompson

Māori All Stars (Women's)
Shanice Parker
Jasmin Strange

References

Newcastle Knights seasons
Newcastle Knights season
2023 NRL Women's season